The 1985 Women's Hockey Asia Cup was the first edition of the Women's Hockey Asia Cup. It was held in Seoul, South Korea from 20 September to 25 September 1985.

South Korea won the group to win the title, with Japan finishing second while  Malaysia took the third place.

Teams

Results

Table

Matches

Winners

Final standings

See also
 1985 Men's Hockey Asia Cup

References

International women's field hockey competitions hosted by South Korea
Women's Hockey Asia Cup
Asia Cup
Women's Hockey Asia Cup
Hockey Asia Cup
Sports competitions in Seoul